The Organization is as follows:

 Regiment
 New Formed Regiment - from 1777 - to 1800

Household Cavalry 

 1st Regiment of Life Guards - Heavy Cavalry, part of the Household Cavalry
 2nd Regiment of Life Guards - Heavy Cavalry, part of the Household Cavalry
 Royal Horse Guards (Blues) - Heavy Cavalry, part of the Household Cavalry

Cavalry

Dragoon Guards 

 1st (The Kings) Dragoon Guards
 2nd (The Queen's) Regiment of Dragoon Guards
 3rd (The Prince of Wales') Dragoon Guards
 4th (Royal Irish) Dragoon Guards
 5th Regiment of Dragoon Guards
 6th Regiment of Dragoon Guards
 7th (The Princess Royal's) Dragoon Guards

Dragoons 

 1st (Royal) Dragoons
 2nd (Royal North British) Dragoons
 3rd (King's Own) Dragoons
 4th (Queen's Own) Dragoons
 6th (Inniskilling) Dragoons

Light Dragoons 

 7th (Queen's Own) Light Dragoons
 8th (The King's Royal Irish) Light Dragoons
 9th Light Dragoons
 10th (Prince of Wales') Light Dragoons
 11th Light Dragoons
 12th (Prince of Wales') Light Dragoons
 13th Light Dragoons
 14th (Duchess of York's) Light Dragoons
 15th (King's) Light Dragoons
 17th Light Dragoons
 18th Light Dragoons
 19th Light Dragoons

Foot Guards 

 1st Regiment of Foot Guards - 4 Battalion from 1803-1804, than reduced to 3
 Coldstream Regiment of Foot Guards - 2 Battalions
 3rd Regiment of Foot Guards - 2 Battalions

Infantry of the Line 
Regiments of Foot, (Infantry of the Line) are line infantry regiments part of the army.

1st (Royal) Regiment of Foot - 4 Battalions from 1804-1816, then 3 until 1817 then 2
2nd (Queen's Royal) Regiment of Foot - 1 Battalion
3rd (East Kent) Regiment of Foot - 2 Battalions from 1803-1815
4th (The King's Own) Regiment of Foot - 2 Battalions from 1804-1815
5th (Northumberland) Regiment of Foot - 2 Battalions from 1804-1816
6th (1st Warwickshire) Regiment of Foot - 2 Battalions from 1804-1815
7th (Royal Fusiliers) Regiment of Foot - 2 Battalions from 1804-1815
8th (King's) Regiment of Foot - 2 Battalions from 1804-1815
9th (East Norfolk) Regiment of Foot - 2 Battalions from 1804-1815
10th (North Lincolnshire) Regiment of Foot - 2 Battalions from 1804-1816
11th (North Devonshire) Regiment of Foot - 2 Battalions from 1808-1816
12th (East Suffolk) Regiment of Foot - 2 Battalions from 1811-1818
13th (1st Somersetshire) Regiment of Foot - 1 Battalion
14th (Bedfordshire) Regiment of Foot - Became Buckinghamshire in 1809 - 2 Battalions 1804-1816 and 3 from 1813-1816
15th (Yorkshire East Riding) Regiment of Foot - 2 Battalions from 1799-1802 and again 1804-1816
16th (Buckinghamshire) Regiment of Foot - Re-named "Bedfordshire" in 1809 - 1 Battalion
17th (Leicestershire) Regiment of Foot - 2 Battalions 1799-1802
18th (Royal Irish) Regiment of Foot - 2 Battalions 1803-1814
19th (1st Yorkshire North Riding) Regiment of Foot - 1 Battalion
20th (East Devonshire) Regiment of Foot - 2 Battalions 1799-1802
21st (Royal North British Fusiliers) Regiment of Foot - 2 Battalions 1804-1816
22nd (Cheshire) Regiment of Foot - 2 Battalions in 1814
23rd (Royal Welch Fusiliers) Regiment of Foot - 2 Battalions 1804-1814
24th (2nd Warwickshire) Regiment of Foot - 2 Battalions 1804-1814
25th (Sussex) Regiment of Foot - Renamed "King's Own Borderers" in 1805 - 2 Battalions 1804-1816
26th (Cameronian) Regiment of Foot - 2 Battalions 1804-1813
27th (Inniskilling) Regiment of Foot - 2 Battalions 1800-1803, than again 1805-1817, 3 Battalions from 1805-1816
28th (North Gloucestershire) Regiment of Foot - 2 Battalions 1803-1814
29th (Worcestershire) Regiment of Foot - 2 Battalions 1795-1796
30th (Cambridgeshire) Regiment of Foot - 2 Battalions 1803-1817
31st (Huntingdonshire) Regiment of Foot - 2 Battalions 1805-1814
32nd (Cornwall) Regiment of Foot - 2 Battalions 1804-1814
33rd (1st Yorkshire West Riding) Regiment of Foot - 1 Battalion
34th (Cumberland) Regiment of Foot - 2 Battalions 1805-1817
35th (Dorsetshire) Regiment of Foot - Renamed "Sussex" in 1805 - 2 Battalions 1799-1803, than again 1804-1817
36th (Herefordshire) Regiment of Foot - 2 Battalions 1804-1814
37th (North Hampshire) Regiment of Foot - 2 Battalions 1813-1817
38th (1st Staffordshire) Regiment of Foot - 2 Battalions 1804-1814
39th (East Middlesex) Regiment of Foot - Renamed "Dorsetshire" in 1807 - 2 Battalions 1803-1815
40th (the 2nd Somersetshire) Regiment of Foot - 2 Battalions 1799-1802 and 1804-1816
41st Regiment of Foot - 2 Battalions in 1813
42nd (Royal Highland) Regiment of Foot - 2 Battalions 1780-1786 and 1804-1812
43rd (Monmouthshire) Regiment of Foot - Became Light Infantry in 1803 - 2 Battalions 1804-1817
44th (East Essex) Regiment of Foot - 2 Battalions 1803-1816
45th (Nottinghamshire) Regiment of Foot - 2 Battalions 1804-1814
46th (South Devonshire) Regiment of Foot - 2 Battalions 1800-1802
47th (Lancashire) Regiment of Foot - 2 Battalions 1794-1795 and 1803-1815
48th (Northamptonshire) Regiment of Foot - 2 Battalion 1803-1814
49th (Princess Charlotte of Wales's) (Hertfordshire) Regiment of Foot - 2 Battalions 1813-1814
50th (West Kent) Regiment of Foot - 2 Battalions 1804-1814
51st (2nd Yorkshire West Riding) Regiment of Foot - Became Light Infantry in 1809, King's Own 1812 - 2 Battalions 1804-1814
52nd (Oxfordshire) Regiment of Foot - Became Light Infantry 1803 - 2 Battalions 1799-1803 and 1804-1815
53rd (Shropshire) Regiment of Foot - 2 Battalions 1803-1817
54th (West Norfolk) Regiment of Foot - 2 Battalions 1800-1802
55th (Westmorland) Regiment of Foot - 1 Battalion
56th (West Essex) Regiment of Foot - 2 Battalions 1804-1817 3 Battalions 1813-1814
57th (West Middlesex) Regiment of Foot - 2 Battalions 1803-1815
58th (Rutlandshire) Regiment of Foot - 2 Battalions 1804-1815
59th (2nd Nottinghamshire) Regiment of Foot - 2 Battalions 1804-1816
60th (Royal American) Regiment of Foot - 8 Battalions from 1813-1819
61st (South Gloucestershire) Regiment of Foot - 2 Battalions 1803-1814
62nd (Wiltshire) Regiment of Foot - 2 Battalions 1799-1802 and 1804-1816
63rd (West Suffolk) Regiment of Foot - 2 Battalions 1804-1814
64th (2nd Staffordshire) Regiment of Foot - ???? No information found..
65th (2nd Yorkshire, North Riding) Regiment of Foot - 1 Battalion
66th (Berkshire) Regiment of Foot - 2 Battalions 1803-1816
67th (South Hampshire) Regiment of Foot - 2 Battalions 1803-1817
68th (Durham) Regiment of Foot - Light Infantry in 1812 - 2 Battalions 1800-1802
69th (South Lincolnshire) Regiment of Foot - 2 Battalions 1795-1796 and 1803-1816
70th (Surrey) Regiment of Foot - Became "Glasgow Lowland" in 1812 - 1 Battalion
71st (Highland) Regiment of Foot - Light Infantry in 1810 - Glasgow Highland in 1808, Glasgow Highland Light Infantry in 1809 Highland Light Infantry in 1810 - 2 Battalions 1778-1783 and 1804-1815
72nd Regiment of Foot - Became Seaforth 1778, Highland in 1786, 72nd in 1809 - 2 Battalions 1804-1816
73rd (Highland) Regiment of Foot - 2 Battalions 1809-1817
74th (Highland) Regiment of Foot - Lost Highland Status in 1809 - 1 Battalion
75th (Highland) Regiment of Foot - Lost Highland Status and dress in 1809 - 1 Battalion
76th (Hindustan) Regiment of Foot - Became Hindustan in 1806, last in 1812 - 1 Battalion
77th Regiment of Foot - Became East Middlesex in 1807 - 1 Battalion
78th (Ross-Shire Buffs Highlanders) Regiment of Foot - 2 Battalions 1793-1796 and 1804-1816
79th (Cameronian Highland Volunteers) Regiment of Foot - Cameron Highlanders in 1804 2 Battalions 1804-1815
80th (Staffordshire Volunteers) Regiment of Foot - Staffordshire Volunteers in 1802, 1 Battalion
81st Regiment of Foot (Loyal Lincoln Volunteers) - Loyal Lincoln Volunteers in 1803, 2 Battalions
82nd Regiment of Foot (Prince of Wales's Volunteers) - Prince of Wales's Volunteers in 1804, 2 Battalions- amalgamated with 40th Regiment of Foot in 1881 to form South Lancashire Regiment
83rd (County of Dublin) Regiment of Foot - 2 Battalions, 1804. Amalgamated with the 86th in 1881 to become the Royal Irish Rifles which is turn became The Royal Ulster Rifles
84th (York and Lancaster) Regiment of Foot - 2 Battalions 1794-1795 and 1808-1819
85th Regiment of Foot (Bucks Volunteers) -  2 Battalions in 1801. Reduced to 1 Battalion in 1802.
86th (Royal County Down) Regiment of Foot - 2 Battalions 1813-14.
87th (Royal Irish Fusiliers) Regiment of Foot - 2 Battalions 1804-1817
88th Regiment of Foot (Connaught Rangers) - 2 Battalions 1805-1816
89th (Princess Victoria's) Regiment of Foot - 2 Battalions 1804-1816
90th Regiment of Foot (Perthshire Volunteers) - 2 Battalions 1794-1795 and 1804-1817
91st (Argyllshire Highlanders) Regiment of Foot - 2 Battalions from 1804-1815
92nd (Gordon Highlanders) Regiment of Foot - 2 Battalions from 1803-1814
93rd (Sutherland Highlanders) Regiment of Foot - 2 Battalions from 1813-1816
94th Regiment of Foot - called ‘The Scotch Brigade’ until 1802. 
Rifle Brigade (The Prince Consort's Own) - formed in 1800 as the Experimental Corps of Rifles, renamed the 95th Regiment of Foot (Rifles) in 1803. 2nd Battalion raised in 1805. 3rd Battalion raised in 1809. 
96th Regiment of Foot -
100th (Prince Regent's County of Dublin) Regiment of Foot - 1 Battalion raised in Ireland in 1804. Transferred to North America in 1805, Prince Regent descriptor granted in 1813. Disbanded in 1818.

Colonial / Foreign  
The British Army raised several colonial and foreign units, including the following:

Canada 

1st (Queen's Rangers) Regiment - 2 Companies [Formed in Canada]

West Indies 
There were twelve West Indies regiment in British service during the time of the Napoleonic Wars.

Menorca 

 The Minorca Regiment - formed on Menorca
 Franc Tireur Corses - company strength, Menorca

Africa 

 Fraser's Corps of Infantry - 2 Companies, later increased to 12 [Formed in West Africa]

India 

 Regiment de Meuron (First raised in Switzerland in 1781 in the service of the Dutch East India Company (VOC), defected and entered British service in 1795 in Ceylon)

Artillery 

Royal Horse Artillery

 A (Chestnut Troop) Battery
 B Battery
 C Battery
 D Battery
 E Battery
 F (Sphinx) Battery

Royal Artillery

 9 (Plassey) Battery
 20 Battery
 30 Battery (Rogers's Company)
 42 (Alem Hamza) Battery
 49 Battery
 53 (Louisburg) Battery
Royal Irish Artillery

References 

Regiments (1881)
Regiments of the British Army